The Beriev Be-1 was an experimental wing-in-ground-effect aircraft developed in the Soviet Union during the 1960s.

Design and development
In 1956, Robert Ludvigovich Bartini approached the Beriev design bureau with a proposal for a Wing-In-Ground-effect vehicle (WIG). The Be-1 became the first experimental prototype, used for exploring the stability and control of wing-in-ground-effect aircraft.

The Be-1 featured two floats with very low aspect ratio wing sections between them and small normal wing panels extending outside the floats. Surface-piercing hydrofoils were mounted on the underside of the floats. The aircraft was powered by a single Tumansky RU-19 turbojet, mounted above the wing. The Be-1 was also equipped with landing gear. The aircraft was operated between 1961 and 1964. The first flight from water was made in 1964.

See also

References

Be-0001
Ekranoplans
Be-1